Sian Clifford (born 7 April 1982) is an English actress. She is best known for playing Claire, the older sister of the titular character in the BBC comedy-drama series Fleabag (2016–2019) and also portrayed Martha Crawley in the ITV/Amazon Studios series Vanity Fair (2018). In 2020, she played Diana Ingram in the ITV series Quiz.

For the second season of Fleabag, Clifford won the BAFTA TV Award for Best Female Comedy Performance, and received a Primetime Emmy nomination for Outstanding Supporting Actress in a Comedy Series as well as a Critics' Choice nomination for Best Supporting Actress in a Comedy Series.

Her theatre credits include Consent at the Harold Pinter Theatre, Pains of Youth at the National Theatre, and The Road to Mecca at the Arcola Theatre.

Early life 
Clifford was born in London on 7 April 1982, the daughter of an executive assistant mother and a father who works for the local council. She grew up in the London borough of Ealing. She has a sister, Natalie, who is an art dealer in New York City. Growing up, she knew she wanted to be an actress and participated in youth theatre. She worked for three years as a writing consultant before being accepted into Royal Academy of Dramatic Art (RADA). While attending RADA, she met her future co-star Phoebe Waller-Bridge early on and they became friends. She earned a BA in acting from RADA in 2006.

Career

2006–2015: Early career and theatre 
In the first ten years of her professional acting career, Clifford became a prolific Off West End actress. In her first few years out of drama school, she was involved with Theatre503 in which she was involved the productions Without Laughing, Contraction, and Listening Out. In March 2007, she acted in the play Not the End of the World at the Bristol Old Vic theatre. Her first notable performance was playing Ismene in the Nottingham Playhouse production of Burial at Thebes at the Barbican which premiered in September 2007.

In Summer 2008, she acted in a play called The Pendulum, written by her co-star Alexander Fiske-Harrison, at the Jermyn Street Theatre in the West End, which ran for the month of June, and in the following month she took part in the annual Latitude Festival in the play Public Displays of Affection. Clifford was in three theatre productions the next summer; in June she had a small role in a chamber opera titled Parthenogenesis at the Royal Opera House's Linbury Studio, she co-starred in the Arcola Theatre play The Road to Mecca, and she toured with the production Is Everyone Okay? which co-starred future Fleabag castmate Phoebe Waller-Bridge.

Throughout September 2010, Clifford starred in the well-reviewed experimental theatre piece Pieces of Vincent at the Arcola Theatre. For the rest of autumn 2010, she had a supporting role in the play Pains of Youth at the prestigious Royal National Theatre. Finishing out the year, Clifford held the titular role in an original production of Beauty and the Beast, also at the Royal National Theatre. The production ran throughout the Christmas season and was critically successful.

In 2014, she was one of the stars of the Nottingham Playhouse's production of Time and the Conways. Also that year, she took part in Good. Clean. Fun., a collection of short plays by Phoebe Waller-Bridge which included an early version of Clifford's Fleabag character Claire, as well as the Victorian-era play Fever at the Jermyn Street Theatre.

During her career, Clifford has also participated in many workshops and readings for Off West End productions. She has often collaborated with DryWrite and Nabako theatre companies, theatre directors Vicky Jones (DryWrite), Lynsey Turner (Royal National theatre, Theatre503) and Andrew Steggall, and writer/actor Phoebe Waller-Bridge.

2016–present: Fleabag and television 
In 2016, Clifford had her breakthrough screen acting role in Fleabag, as Claire, Fleabag's uptight older sister and character foil.

Clifford was part of the cast of the play Gloria, part of Hampstead Theatre's 2017 Season and the play's Off West End premiere. In 2018, she had a recurring role in the ITV miniseries Vanity Fair and was in a production of Circle Mirror Transformation in Manchester. Later that year she was part of the cast in the West End production of Consent at the Harold Pinter Theatre.

Fleabag returned in 2019 to huge fanfare. Clifford's performance in the show was widely praised and she was nominated for the Emmy Award for Supporting Actress in a Comedy Series and the Critics' Choice Award for Supporting Actress in a Comedy Series for her performance. She later won the BAFTA Television Award for Best Female Comedy Performance.

Following the second series of Fleabag, Clifford starred in more film and television roles. She had a small role in the independent dark comedy film A Serial Killer's Guide to Life in 2019. In 2020, Clifford had guest roles on the television shows Hitmen on Sky One and Liar. She starred opposite Matthew Macfadyen in the April 2020 miniseries Quiz, based on the 2001 Charles Ingram Who Wants to Be A Millionaire? scandal. Clifford later co-starred in the Sky comedy series Two Weeks to Live.

In May 2021, Clifford starred as Iris in the Inside No. 9 episode "Lip Service." In July 2021, Clifford voiced GS-8 in Star Wars: The Bad Batch.

Personal life 
Clifford is a vegan and practises daily meditation. In 2016, she launched a digital wellness and meditation platform called Still Space.

Filmography

References

External links 
 

1985 births
Living people
Best Female Comedy Performance BAFTA Award (television) winners
English film actresses
English television actresses